José Mauro Volkmer de Castilho (1946–1998) was a Brazilian scientist, teacher and researcher.

Background
Castilho began his academic life at the Federal University of Rio Grande do Sul where he studied engineering. After graduation, in 1971, he went to Rio de Janeiro where he obtained his master's degree in 1973 and Phd in 1982 both on PUC Rio University.  
José Mauro died of cancer in 1998, he was married and father of three children.

Scientific activity
As one of the database and artificial intelligence research pioneers in Brazil, Professor Castilho helped to form a full generation of professionals and researchers in these areas.

In his honor, since 1998, Brazilian Computer Society sponsors the Jose Mauro de Castilho Award which is given to the best paper as selected by the program committee.

External links
 DBLP Bibliography Server
 acm Portal
 Computer Science Bibliographies
 History of the Computer Sciences Institute - UFRGS 
 José Mauro Castilho Auditorium
 Brazilian Scientific and Technological Development Committee - Researchers

1946 births
1998 deaths
Brazilian computer scientists
Artificial intelligence researchers
Brazilian science writers
People from Rio Grande do Sul
Brazilian people of German descent
Deaths from cancer in Brazil
Federal University of Rio Grande do Sul alumni